Leopold Krakauer (March 1890 – December 1954) was an architect and a painter. He was one of the most prominent architects who worked in Israel in the mid-twenties. He was also a painter who presented drawings and paintings at exhibitions in Israel and all over the world. Krakauer lived in Israel from 1924 until his death.

Biography
Leopold Krakauer was born in Vienna, the capital of Austria on March 30, 1890. He attended the Royal Imperial High School in Vienna. Then, from 1907 to 1912, Krakauer was a student at the Department of Engineering and Architecture, the Technical College, in Vienna.

In 1909, he studied architecture at the Imperial Academy of Arts in Vienna. In World War I, he served on the Italian front. During the war, he worked on his own designs. In 1919, Krakauer had an exhibition in Vienna. At this exhibition, he met his wife, Greta Wolfe. From 1920–1921, Krakauer participated in the planning of the parliament building in Belgrade.

Being one of the finest architects of the International Style of his time, Krakauer immigrated to Palestine with his wife in 1924 after winning an architectural competition for Palestine and soon became involved in architectural projects. He began to work under the leadership of Alexander Baerwald in Haifa. Later, Krakauer moved to Jerusalem. He worked on designing many houses in Jerusalem as well as in other parts of Israel. He was prominent in planning dining rooms and other public buildings. Krakauer was the first to bring modern architecture to Israel. Krakauer was particularly inspired by the architect Adolf Loos, who was also a frequent visitor to his home in Vienna.

In 1948, he was appointed as a member of the Committee of the Flag Symbol, under the Provisional State Council. Krakauer helped choose the symbol of Israel.

His daughter Trude Dothan was an archaeologist. His grandson is Danny Dotan, a singer and songwriter.

Works
Most of Krakauer's work focuses on field drawing. Many of his works depict Jerusalem and its landscapes. His works can be found in museums in Amsterdam, Munich, and Zurich, as well as all over Europe.

His most famous architectural works include:
 "Bunam House", "The Boksboim" and "Kisher House" in the Rehavia neighbourhood of Jerusalem
 Beit Ussishkin museum on Kibbutz Dan
 Dining rooms in Beit Alfa, Tel Yosef 1933
 Hotel Talpash in Haifa

External links
 Leopold Krakauer Memorial Exhibition, Davar, January 21, 1955
 Extraordinary artist: Memorial Exhibition of the Krakauer Haifa Museum, Maariv, August 5, 1955
 Article on the remodeling of Beit Bunem
 Stamp issued by the Philatelic Service in 1990 showing the dining room designed by Krakauer at Kibbutz Tel Yosef
 Hecht Museum Exhibition
 Chapters in the making and shaping of the collective dining room (1926–1935), Cathedra 70, January 1994 (article deals with, among other things, the planning of the dining rooms at the Alpha and Tel Yosef)
 The Last Supper: The historic dining room at Tel Yosef becomes a warehouse, February 8, 2015
 Architecture February 24, 2015
 Review on Building architecture – The Teltsch Haifa Hotel May 14, 2015
 
 

1890 births
1954 deaths
Austrian Jews
Artists from Vienna
Academy of Fine Arts Vienna alumni
TU Wien alumni
Austro-Hungarian military personnel of World War I
Austrian emigrants to Mandatory Palestine
Jews in Mandatory Palestine
Jewish painters
Israeli painters
Jewish Israeli artists
International style architects
Jewish architects
Architects in Mandatory Palestine
Israeli architects